Poor Rich Ones (1989-2003) was a pop and rock band from Bergen, Norway, comprised by lead singer, songwriter and guitarist William Hut, keyboardist Bjørn Bunes, bassist Tor Sørensen, guitarists Eivind Kvamme, Espen Mellingen, and drummer Bjarte Ludvigsen ("blue").

Formed in 1994, the band released their debut album Naivety's Star in 1996 on the local label Rec 90. Q magazine described their style as "infinitely sad and nocturnal, yet uplifting rather than depressing", calling the band "Norway's own Radiohead".

After four successful album releases, including a final "best of" album after a United States tour, the band effectively dissolved in 2003. Although they have not broken up officially, the band's homepage states they have "no future plans". Vocalist William Hut has pursued a solo career, often assisted by ex-band colleague Bjørn Bunes.
In 2015 the band reformed for a one-off gig, but have since continued playing shows every now and then.

Honors 
  Spellemannprisen 1997 in the class Rock for the album From the Makers of Ozium

Discography

Albums 
 Naivety's Star (1996)
 From the Makers of Ozium (1997)
 Happy Happy Happy (February 15, 2000)
 Joe Maynard's Favourites (2001)

EPs 
 Soundtrack EP (Besteborgere) (1999)
 Bubble Bowling (1997)
 All Those Present/Drown EP

Singles 
 "Mummy" (1995)
 "This Great Standing Still" (1996)
 "Fear of Losing" (1997)
 "Strong" (1997)
 "Anyway/Somehow" (1998)
 "Hunting High and Low" (1999)
 "Small Glimpse" (1999)
 "Old Age and Failures"

References

External links 
 Poor Rich Ones official website

Musical groups from Bergen
Spellemannprisen winners
Norwegian rock music groups
Musical groups established in 1989
1989 establishments in Norway